Amalda southlandica, is a poorly known species of sea snail, a marine gastropod mollusc in the family Ancillariidae. The evaluation of the species remains incomplete, because so far only juveniles have been found. Juvenile specimens of this olive have been found at depths of between 25 and 60 m.

References

 Powell A W B, New Zealand Mollusca, William Collins Publishers Ltd, Auckland, New Zealand 1979 

southlandica
Gastropods of New Zealand
Gastropods described in 1948